John Spencer Hughes (March 18, 1954 – April 8, 2020) was a Canadian professional ice hockey player.

Career 
The bulk of his professional career was spent in the World Hockey Association (WHA), where he played from 1974 until 1979 for the Phoenix Roadrunners, Cincinnati Stingers, Houston Aeros, Indianapolis Racers, and Edmonton Oilers.

When the WHA folded in 1979, Hughes moved to the National Hockey League (NHL), briefly playing for the Vancouver Canucks, the Oilers (who joined the NHL), and New York Rangers. He retired in 1982. Hughes had 18 goals, 130 assists, 148 points and 778 penalty minutes in 372 regular season games in the WHA and two goals, 14 assists, 16 points and 211 penalty minutes in 70 regular season games in the NHL.

Personal life 
Hughes died on April 8, 2020, in Charlottetown, Prince Edward Island. He had two children, a son Jason and a daughter Jessica.

Career statistics

Regular season and playoffs

References

External links

1954 births
2020 deaths
Canadian expatriate ice hockey players in the United States
Canadian ice hockey defencemen
Cincinnati Stingers players
Edmonton Oilers players
Edmonton Oilers (WHA) players
Houston Aeros draft picks
Houston Aeros (WHA) players
Ice hockey people from Prince Edward Island
Indianapolis Racers players
New Haven Nighthawks players
New York Rangers players
Phoenix Roadrunners (WHA) players
Springfield Indians players
Sportspeople from Charlottetown
Toronto Marlboros players
Vancouver Canucks draft picks
Vancouver Canucks players
Wichita Wind players